The 1984 Labatt Brier was held from March 4 to 11 at the Victoria Memorial Arena  in Victoria, British Columbia.

Michael Riley of Manitoba defeated Ed Werenich of Ontario to win his first and only Brier title.

Teams

Round robin standings

Round robin results

Draw 1

Draw 2

Draw 3

Draw 4

Draw 5

Draw 6

Draw 7

Draw 8

Draw 9

Draw 10

Draw 11

Draw 12

Draw 13

Draw 14

Draw 15

Tiebreakers

Round 1

Round 2

Playoffs

Semifinal

Final
In the final, Riley bucked conventional wisdom in terms of strategy, by opting to come around corner guards that were played by Ontario, rather than peeling them. Manitoba stole two in the third when Werenich missed a takeout to take a 3-1 lead. The team then played "flawlessly" en route to a 7-4 win. Riley curled 86% in the game compared to Werenich's 76%.  4,569 people were on hand to watch the final.

Statistics
Curling Canada does not keep a public record of shooting percentages before 1985, but percentages were reported at the time. Alberta's Ed Lukowich had the highest shooting percentage among the skips at 76%, followed by Ontario's Ed Werenich and Manitoba's Michael Riley at 75% and Saskatchewan's Gary Bryden at 74%. Saskatchewan's Dale Graham was the top third at 79%, and second Wilf Foss was the best at his position, curling 82%. Among the leads, there was a three-way tie at 81% with Saskatchewan's Jerry Zimmer, Ontario's Neil Harrison and Alberta's Brent Syme.

References

1984
Sports competitions in Victoria, British Columbia
Labatt Brier
Curling in British Columbia
Labatt Brier
Labatt Brier